Judo at the 2018 Summer Youth Olympics was held from 7 to 10 October 2018.

Medal summary

Medal table

Medallists

Boys events

Girls events

Team Event

References

External links

 
Official Results Book – Judo

 
Judo
2018
Youth Summer Olympics
Judo competitions in Argentina